The 2016 Nürnberger Versicherungscup was a professional tennis tournament played on clay courts. It was the 4th edition of the tournament, and part of the 2016 WTA Tour. It took place in Nuremberg, Germany, on 15–21 May 2016.

Points and prize money

Point distribution

Prize money

Singles main draw entrants

Seeds 

 1 Rankings as of May 9, 2016.

Other entrants 
The following players received wildcards into the singles main draw:
  Mira Antonitsch
  Katharina Gerlach
  Katharina Hobgarski

The following players received entry from the qualifying draw:
  Kiki Bertens
  Olga Fridman
  Barbora Krejčíková
  Tatjana Maria
  Marina Melnikova
  Stephanie Vogt

The following players received entry as lucky losers:
  Cristina Dinu
  Antonia Lottner

Withdrawals 
Before the tournament
  Mona Barthel → replaced by  Carina Witthöft
  Angelique Kerber → replaced by  Anastasija Sevastova
  Madison Keys → replaced by  Polona Hercog
  Karin Knapp → replaced by  Bethanie Mattek-Sands
  Bethanie Mattek-Sands → replaced by  Antonia Lottner
  Anastasija Sevastova → replaced by  Cristina Dinu

During the tournament
  Lesia Tsurenko

Retirements 
  Irina Falconi

Doubles main draw entrants

Seeds 

1 Rankings as of May 9, 2016.

Other entrants 
The following pairs received wildcards into the doubles main draw:
  Katharina Hobgarski /  Carina Witthöft
  Sandra Klemenschits /  Antonia Lottner

Withdrawals 
During the tournament
  Anna-Lena Friedsam (lower back injury)

Champions

Singles 

  Kiki Bertens def.  Mariana Duque Mariño, 6–2, 6–2

Doubles 

  Kiki Bertens /  Johanna Larsson def.  Shuko Aoyama /  Renata Voráčová, 6–3, 6–4

External links 
 Official website

2016 WTA Tour
2016
2016 in German tennis